James Hirschfeld,  is an entrepreneur. Hirschfeld co-founded the online invitation website Paperless Post.

Work
Hirschfeld, started Paperless Post while he was a student at Harvard and his sister Alexa Hirschfeld was working in New York City in 2008. Paperless Post launched in 2009. Today, he serves as the Chief Executive Officer of the concern.

References

Harvard University alumni
Living people
American technology chief executives
Year of birth missing (living people)
American company founders